Sam Gombya is a Ugandan musician, radio presenter  and social activist. He has taken part in the campaign against tobacco. He is married to fellow musician Sophie Gombya.

Early life and education
Sam Gombya went to Nabagereka Primary School and then to Seven Hills Secondary School. He is radio presenter at Dembe Fm in Kampala.

Music
Sam Gombya sings in bass. He is known for his song "Sebo Muko", which he performs with his wife. He has six albums with his wife.

Discography

Songs
Sebo Muko
Lujja Lumu

Albums with Sophie Gombya
Nkwesize Mu Bbuba

References

External links 
"Entertainment couples"

21st-century Ugandan male singers
Living people
Kumusha
Year of birth missing (living people)